Kharkiv Railway Station is a railway station in Kharkiv, the second largest city in Ukraine.

History
The first station in Kharkiv was built in 1869 by famous Russian architect Andrey Ton. However, with the development of railways (especially after the opening of the road to Balashov in 1895) in 1896–1901, the station was expanded and modernized by architect I. Zagoskin, (and completed by architect J. Caune), became one of the largest in the Russian Empire.

The current (third) station is built in the "Stalin Empire style" with elements of classicism. It was opened on 2 November 1952 to replace the previous station, which was destroyed during World War II. Architects – G. I. Voloshin, B. S. Mezentsev, E. A. Lymar; engineer S. Owls. Building trust "Ugtransstroy" under the direction of M. L. Bondarenko. The volume of the station is 80,000 m3, height of the hall is 26 m, the height of the towers is 42 m, the diameter of the clock in the South tower is 4.25 m. In 1950, canopies were constructed over the platforms. Between 1978 and 1982, the building was expanded to the South (to the left of Station Square) in a contemporary style by the project of the Institute Khargiprotrans (architects Y. Murygin, L. V. Gurova, L. P. Yushkin, S. A. kukhtin, and A. N. Zhirnov). A 54-room, 16-storey hotel, "the Express" was built at the station. The station was "cosmetically" restored in 2003 for the 350th anniversary of Kharkiv. The total area of station is 32,600 m2, platforms and tunnels – 33,100 m2.

During the 2022 Russian invasion of Ukraine, Russian forces destroyed parts of the station.

Trains
 Kharkiv – Bakhmut (Bakhmut serving as last station to Donetsk and Luhansk since 2014)
 Kharkiv – Dnipro
 Kharkiv – Odessa
 Kharkiv – Kyiv
 Kharkiv – Kryvyi Rih
 Kharkiv – Kremenchuk
 Kharkiv – Lviv
 Kharkiv – Mariupol
 Kharkiv – Baku
 Kharkiv – Kherson
 Kharkiv – Baranovichi
 Kharkiv – Odessa
 Kharkiv – Berdiansk
 Kharkiv – Astana
 Kharkiv – Moscow

See also
 Ukrainian Railways
 Southern Ukrainian Railways

References

External links

Graphical information from Wikimapia
Official Website of Southern Ukrainian Railways

Railway stations in Kharkiv Oblast
Buildings and structures in Kharkiv
Southern Railways (Ukraine) stations